Sheena Reyes is a Filipino-Australian actress and filmmaker.  Reyes played the role of Carey Thompson on soap opera Neighbours. Her television credits include a supporting role on the ABC's The Beautiful Lie, a recurring role on In Your Dreams (Season 1 and Season 2) on Network Ten, Seven Network's TV series City Homicide, and Offspring on Network Ten.

Filmography

Awards and nominations

Writer
Reyes commenced her study in Screenwriting at RMIT University in 2009, being taught and mentored by Tim Ferguson.  Reyes is a writer for American online news publication, Elite Daily -"The Voice of Generation Y."

Filmmaker
Reyes directed the official music video for Australian singer-songwriter Starley's "Call on Me., which made its debut digital release in July 2016.

Guinness World Record
As a Motorsport Model at the 2010 Australian Grand Prix, Reyes broke the Guinness World Record at Melbourne Grand Prix Circuit in Albert Park for Putting on the Most Pairs of Under Pants in 60 Seconds: 22 Pairs. On 20 June 2011, Reyes appeared on the set of Channel Seven's, The Morning Show hosted by Larry Emdur and Kylie Gillies and broke her existing World Record for the second time.  On 28 July 2011, Reyes broke the World Record for the third time on the set of Channel Seven's, Sunrise competing against Australian Television Personality Grant Denyer.  Reyes currently maintains the new Guinness World Record Title for Putting on the Most Pairs of Under Pants in 60 Seconds: 36 Pairs.

References

External links 
 
Grant Denyer challenges Sheena Reyes
Undies Rematch - SUNRISE
Motorsport Model breaks World Record - THE MORNING SHOW

Australian television actresses
1987 births
Living people